Meares Cliff is an angular coastal cliff that rises to , located  west-northwest of Nelson Cliff along the north coast of Victoria Land, Antarctica. It was first charted by the Northern Party, led by Victor Campbell, of the British Antarctic Expedition, 1910–13, and was named by Campbell for Cecil H. Meares who had charge of the dogs on this expedition.

References

Cliffs of Victoria Land
Pennell Coast